Grey elaenia refers to birds that had been considered one species and have been split into three species:
 Gray-headed elaenia, Myiopagis caniceps
 Choco elaenia, Myiopagis parambae
 Amazonian elaenia, Myiopagis cinerea

Birds by common name